The Kakua Rangers of Bo is a Sierra Leonean football club based in Bo, the second largest city of Sierra Leone. The club is currently a member of the Sierra Leone National Premier League, the highest football league in Sierra Leone. They are currently one of the favorites to win the ongoing league. The Kakua Rangers have an intense rivalry with city rival Nepean Stars. They have been the most dominant club in Bo.

References

Football clubs in Sierra Leone
Bo, Sierra Leone